Apatania zonella is a species of insect belonging to the family Apataniidae.

It has almost cosmopolitan distribution.

References

Trichoptera